Y-box-binding protein 2 is a protein that in humans is encoded by the YBX2 gene.

See also
 RNA polymerase II
 Transcription (biology)
 Translation (biology)

References

Further reading